The Galleria at White Plains is a shopping mall located in downtown White Plains, New York, US, a commercial and residential suburb  north of New York City. The mall featured the major anchors Macy’s and Sears, and junior anchors Forever 21, H&M and Blink Fitness, all of which had since permanently closed down. On December 21, 2022, it was announced that the Galleria at White Plains will be permanently closing in March 2023 to replace the mall with a mixed use site.

History
It opened in the summer of 1980 and was the first of three Gallerias to open in the fall of 1980 around the nation, the others being Sherman Oaks and Fort Lauderdale. Its anchor stores are Macy's and Sears, which were relocated to the mall from nearby locations on Main Street to replace the original anchor stores. Abraham & Straus occupied the east anchor spot until converting to Stern's in 1995 and being replaced by Macy's on July 15, 2001. The west anchor JCPenney closed on April 28, 2001, and was left vacant until September 2003 when Sears moved in. 

Martin Luther King Blvd. runs directly underneath the mall. The Galleria was constructed adjacent to a large two-block-long parking garage that is connected directly to the mall at various levels. Shopping floors were color-coded blue, green, yellow, and red representing Street Level, Garden Level, the Garden food court area, and Fashion Level 1 and 2, respectively when the mall opened. During the holiday season, the mall's promotional slogan was "We bring more good things to Christmas." 

The Galleria underwent a substantial renovation in the 1990s that undid many original elements; the glass elevator is the only significant feature dating from the mall's opening that survives relatively untouched. During the 1990s remodel, the waterfall and stage in the center court were replaced with two miniature fountains between the escalators. In recent years, the mall has experienced competition from newer and more upscale retail developments, such as The Westchester mall and The Source at White Plains.  A late 1990s promotional advertisement featured the tag line "Shopping for the real world," a subtle jab at the more upscale and affluent clientele and stores at The Westchester roughly a half-mile away.

On September 18, 2006, Philip Grant, a homeless convicted rapist, was convicted of murder as a hate crime for stabbing Concetta Russo-Carriero to death in a Galleria parking garage on June 29, 2005, because, according to Grant's videotaped confession, she was white with blond hair and blue eyes.

Interior shots of the mall were used in the 2018 film Eighth Grade as well as the 2022 film Somewhere in Queens.

On November 10, 2020, it was announced Sears would close. On January 5, 2021, Macy's announced as part of a strategy to focus on the highest achieving locations that they would be closing. 

In November 2022, it was announced that the owners of The Galleria at White Plains are teaming up with two prominent development firms to update the mall as a vibrant mixed-use center that will be enfolded by residential development and amenity-based retail. One of the developers, Louis R. Cappelli, has had a presence in White Plains for decades and is known for developing the nearby 46-story Ritz-Carlton towers. On December 21, 2022, PRCP announced that the Galleria at White Plains would close in March 2023 for redevelopment.

Some of the last small chain stores operating in February 2023, the month before the mall's closure include Claire's, Famous Footwear, GNC, Jimmy Jazz, Kay Jewelers, LensCrafters, Lids, and Rainbow. All these stores closed throughout the month and the only chain store left is a LensCrafters, which will subsequently close with the rest of the mall soon.

Former anchor stores
Abraham & Straus (opened in 1981 and closed in 1995 and became Stern's)
Stern's (opened in 1995 in the former Abraham & Straus space and closed in 2001 and became Macy's)
JCPenney (opened in 1981 and closed in 2001 and became Sears)
Sears (opened in 2003 in the former JCPenney space and closed on January 24, 2021)
Macy's (opened in 2001 in the former Stern's space and closed on March 21, 2021)
Forever 21 (opened in 2013 and closed in 2023)
H&M (opened in 2013 and closed in 2023)

References

External links 
Galleria at White Plains official website

Buildings and structures in White Plains, New York
Shopping malls in New York (state)
Defunct shopping malls in the United States
Shopping malls established in 1980
Shopping malls in the New York metropolitan area
Shopping malls disestablished in 2023